Jonathan Daniel Glaser (born June 20, 1968) is an American actor, comedian, and writer. He is best known for his work as a writer and sketch performer for many years on Late Night with Conan O'Brien, creating and starring in the Adult Swim series Delocated and Neon Joe, Werewolf Hunter as well as the truTV series Jon Glaser Loves Gear.

Glaser had a recurring role as Councilman Jeremy Jamm on the NBC series Parks and Recreation and appeared as Laird on the HBO series Girls. Glaser is also a writer on the Comedy Central sketch series Inside Amy Schumer.

Early life and education
Glaser was born and raised in the Detroit suburb of Southfield, Michigan. He attended Southfield-Lathrup High School, graduating in 1986.
He is a graduate of the University of Michigan, where he performed in the sketch comedy troupes Comedy Company and Just Kidding with Jon Hein, H. Anthony Lehv, Matthew Schlein, Kristin Sobditch, Sara K. Mathison, and Craig Neuman. He is of Jewish background.

Career
Jon Glaser is a five-time Emmy nominee with the writing staff of Late Night with Conan O'Brien.  He has appeared in the films Pootie Tang, School for Scoundrels, and Be Kind Rewind, and he has guest-starred on comedy programs such as Curb Your Enthusiasm, Louie, Wonder Showzen, Bob's Burgers and Aqua Teen Hunger Force. He was also a lead voice actor in several animated comedy programs such as Stroker and Hoop, Freak Show, and Lucy the Daughter of The Devil. In 2012, he began a recurring role as Leslie Knope's rival, Councilman Jeremy Jamm in the fifth and sixth seasons of the NBC sitcom Parks and Recreation.

Glaser is the creator and star of the live-action Adult Swim series Delocated, about "Jon", a man in the witness protection program with his own reality show. The show aired its final episode on March 7, 2013. Glaser's Delocated character, "Jon" was also featured as a DJ on an Adult Swim-themed radio station in the video game Saints Row: The Third. In February 2012, Glaser appeared as the spokesman in a series of Subway commercials playing his Delocated character.

Glaser was a member of the mainstage cast of The Second City during the mid-1990s, performing alongside future Saturday Night Live head writer Adam McKay and cast member Rachel Dratch, as well as future Mr. Show and 30 Rock cast member Scott Adsit. In Second City's award-winning revue Pinata Full of Bees, which was directed by Tom Gianas, Glaser sang about the importance of not betraying a friendship by pretending not to have legs in order to play in a wheelchair basketball league. He also provided musical accompaniment for the show's climax by drumming in a demonic pig mask, and appeared onstage throughout the show to pass judgement on audience members for laughing at jokes he considered socially irresponsible.

Early in his television career, Glaser wrote and occasionally performed on the short-lived sketch comedy programs The Jenny McCarthy Show on MTV and The Dana Carvey Show. He also made one appearance as a correspondent on The Daily Show in 2004. Glaser is also known for his comedic partnership with H. Jon Benjamin. For a number of years they hosted a live sketch show together in New York City called Midnight Pajama Jam, and have also performed stand-up comedy together for many years, often playing characters who bicker and argue with each other while on stage. Glaser created and starred in the Comedy Central web-series Tiny Hands, which has been shown on the channel's short film series Atom TV a number of times. More recently Glaser worked as a contributing writer and occasional performer on the sketch comedy programs Human Giant, Jon Benjamin Has a Van and Nick Swardson's Pretend Time, as well as providing voices in the animated film Aqua Teen Hunger Force Colon Movie Film for Theaters. In 2009, Glaser worked as the head writer and segment producer on the HBO sports program Joe Buck Live. Glaser also appeared on the ESPN classic show Cheap Seats, providing such roles as "Beamy" and the "Score Settler".

Glaser is currently a voice actor for the animated version of the cartoon strip Get Your War On and appearing as "Video Cowboy" in ESPN's Mayne Street starring Kenny Mayne. Glaser was also the lead singer in the New York City-based comedy band "Detroit Octane"; they performed their song "Barack Obama-sistible" (sung to the tune of the Robert Palmer song "Simply Irresistible") on Late Night with Conan O'Brien on June 17, 2008. He was also the bass player in "A Matter of Trust", another comedy music project he was involved in with comedians H. Jon Benjamin, Todd Barry and Tom Shillue.  The band's gimmick was that they only played the Billy Joel song "A Matter of Trust" over and over again, and refused to play any other songs. They performed as an opening act for The New Pornographers in 2006. He also appeared in seasons 2, 3 and 4 of HBO's Girls as Laird, a recovering addict and neighbor of Lena Dunham's character Hannah. He appears in the film Trainwreck.

Glaser's first published book My Dead Dad Was in ZZ Top, was released on February 8, 2011.

Glaser appeared on Ken Reid's TV Guidance Counselor Podcast on April 24, 2015. The episode was recorded live as part of the 2015 Eugene Mirman Comedy Festival in Boston.

Glaser's mini-series for Adult Swim, Neon Joe, Werewolf Hunter premiered on December 7, 2015.

Glaser's mockumentary series Jon Glaser Loves Gear premiered October 25, 2016 on truTV.

Filmography

Film

Television

References

External links

 Interview with Jon Glaser

1968 births
Living people
American comedy musicians
American male comedians
American male film actors
Jewish American male actors
American stand-up comedians
American male television actors
American television directors
Television producers from Illinois
American television writers
American male television writers
American male voice actors
American sketch comedians
Male actors from Detroit
University of Michigan alumni
Male actors from Chicago
People from Southfield, Michigan
21st-century American male actors
Comedians from Illinois
Screenwriters from Illinois
Screenwriters from Michigan
21st-century American comedians
21st-century American screenwriters
21st-century American male writers
21st-century American Jews
Television producers from Michigan